Jorge Henrique da Costa Vides (born 24 November 1992) is a Brazilian track and field sprinter who competes in the 100 metres and 200 metres. He represented his country at the 2016 Summer Olympics. He holds a 200 m personal best of 20.34 seconds.

Vides is a frequent member of the Brazilian 4 × 100 metres relay team. He won gold in the relay at the 2012 South American Under-23 Championships in Athletics and graduated to senior gold in the event at the 2013 South American Championships in Athletics. He took an individual 200 m medal at that event, taking the bronze. He won a 200 m and relay gold medal double at the 2014 Ibero-American Championships in Athletics held in São Paulo. He placed fourth at the IAAF World Relays with Brazil in both 2014 and 2015.

At the 2016 Rio Olympics in his home town of Rio de Janeiro, he ran in the 200 m heats and teamed up with Ricardo de Souza, Vitor Hugo dos Santos, and Bruno de Barros to take sixth in the relay final.

He competed at the 2020 Summer Olympics.

Personal bests
100 m: 10.08 (wind: +0.3 m/s) –  São Bernardo do Campo, 18 Aug 2018
200 m: 20.34 (wind: +0.1 m/s) –  Trujillo, 26 Aug 2018
4x100 m relay: 38.01 –  London, 21 Jul 2019

All information from World Athletics profile.

International competitions

References

External links

Living people
1992 births
Athletes from Rio de Janeiro (city)
Brazilian male sprinters
Olympic athletes of Brazil
Athletes (track and field) at the 2016 Summer Olympics
Athletes (track and field) at the 2019 Pan American Games
Pan American Games athletes for Brazil
Pan American Games gold medalists for Brazil
Pan American Games medalists in athletics (track and field)
Medalists at the 2019 Pan American Games
Ibero-American Championships in Athletics winners
Athletes (track and field) at the 2020 Summer Olympics
20th-century Brazilian people
21st-century Brazilian people